William Talley House may refer to:

William Talley House (Safford, Arizona), listed on the NRHP in Arizona
William Talley House (Wilmington, Delaware), listed on the NRHP in Wilmington, Delaware